Gavialiceps arabicus is an eel in the family Muraenesocidae (pike congers). It was described by Umberto D'Ancona in 1928, originally under the genus Leptocephalus. It is a marine, deep water-dwelling eel which is known from the western Indian Ocean, including the Gulf of Aden, the southeastern Arabian Sea, Socotra, Yemen and Maldives.

References

Muraenesocidae
Fish described in 1928